The Ukrainians in Slovakia form a small minority in the country. Ukraine and Slovakia share a border, and eastern Slovakia has traditionally had several Ukrainian villages in the Carpathians (many of which are still there). The town of Svidník is generally regarded as the capital of the Ukrainians in Slovakia, and has a museum dedicated to Ukrainian culture. Although Ukraine shares a border with Slovakia and not the Czech Republic, the latter has far more Ukrainians (over ten times as much) than Slovakia due to an immigration boom.

See also 
 Slovakia–Ukraine relations
 Ruthenians and Ukrainians in Czechoslovakia (1918–1938)
 2022 Ukrainian refugee crisis
 Ukrainians in the Czech Republic

References

Ethnic groups in Slovakia
Slovakia
Ukrainian diaspora in Europe